Ommatauxesis is a monotypic genus of Australian araneomorph spiders in the family Toxopidae containing the single species, Ommatauxesis macrops. It was first described by Eugène Simon in 1903, and has only been found in Australia. Originally placed with the Cybaeidae, it was moved to the intertidal spiders in 1967, and to the Toxopidae in 2017.

References

Monotypic Araneomorphae genera
Spiders of Australia
Taxa named by Eugène Simon
Toxopidae